Thomas or Tom Sanders may refer to:

Sports
 Thomas Sanders (cricketer) (1809–1852), American cricketer
 Thomas Sanders (American football) (born 1962), Canadian football player
 Tommy Sanders (born 1954), German sportscaster
 Tom Sanders (rugby union) (born 1994), New England rugby union player
 Satch Sanders (Thomas Ernest Sanders, born 1938), American basketball player and coach

Other
 Thomas Sanders (politician) (1836–1874), Quebec merchant and politician
 Thomas A. Sanders (1889-1946), American real estate developer and politician from Maine
 Thomas E. Sanders (1953–2017), production designer
 Thomas K. Sanders (1932–2011), American bridge player
 Thomas Sanders (entertainer) (born 1989), American Viner and YouTuber
 Tom Sanders (mathematician) (active 2007), English mathematician
 Thomas Charles Sanders (1904–1967), English actor known as Tom Conway

See also
 Tom Sandars (born 1976), British radio newsreader